Leporinus unitaeniatus is a species of Leporinus widely found in the Rios Araguaia and Rio Tocantins in Brazil in South America. This species can reach a length of  SL.

References

Taxa named by Júlio César Garavello
Taxa named by Geraldo Mendes dos Santos
Taxa described in 2009
Fish described in 2009
Anostomidae